The Socialist Republican Party was an Irish republican political party in Northern Ireland. It was founded in 1944 by a coalition of former Nationalist Party members, former Irish Republican Army (IRA) members and Protestant trade unionists around Victor Halley, all based in West Belfast.

The party produced a newspaper, Northern Star, edited by Vincent MacDowell (father of former Green MEP Nuala Ahern) who would go on to be active at various times in the Northern Ireland Civil Rights Association, the Green Party for which he was elected a councillor and the Irish Labour Party.

In the 1945 Northern Ireland general election, the party won 5,497 votes and Harry Diamond took the Belfast Falls seat. He held the seat in 1949, with no other candidate contesting it.  A couple of months later, the group joined the Irish Labour Party. Diamond later stood for Parliament under a variety of labels before forming the Republican Labour Party.

References

Defunct political parties in Northern Ireland
Irish republican parties
Political parties established in 1944
Socialist parties in Ireland
1944 establishments in Northern Ireland
Political parties disestablished in 1949
1949 disestablishments in Northern Ireland